Manalapan Township is a township in Monmouth County, in the U.S. state of New Jersey. The township is centrally located within the Raritan Valley region and is a part of the New York Metropolitan Area. As of the 2020 United States census, the township's population was 40,905, its highest decennial count ever and an increase of 2,033 (+5.2%) from the 2010 census count of 38,872, which in turn reflected an increase of 5,449 (+16.3%) from the 33,423 counted in the 2000 census.

The name "Manalapan" is derived from a word in the Lenape language that would mean either "land of good bread", "good land to settle upon", "good bread" or "covered swamp with edible roots".

History

The Battle of Monmouth was fought in 1778 on land that is now part of Manalapan and Freehold townships. Monmouth Battlefield State Park occupies  in the two townships. 

Manalapan Township was formed by an act of the New Jersey Legislature on March 9, 1848, from portions of Freehold Township. Englishtown was formed as a borough from portions of Manalapan on January 4, 1888, based on the results of a referendum held the previous day.

Geography

According to the United States Census Bureau, the township had a total area of 30.88 square miles (79.99 km2), including 30.65 square miles (79.39 km2) of land and 0.23 square miles (0.60 km2) of water (0.75%).

The township completely surrounds Englishtown, making it part of 21 pairs of "doughnut towns" in the state, where one municipality entirely surrounds another. The township borders the municipalities of Freehold Township, Marlboro Township and Millstone Township in Monmouth County; and Monroe Township and Old Bridge Township in Middlesex County.

Yorketown (with a 2010 Census population of 6,535) is an unincorporated community and census-designated place (CDP) located within Manalapan Township.

Other unincorporated communities, localities and place names located partially or completely within the township include Cahills Corners, Clarks Mills, Elton, Gordons Corner, Lafayette Mills, Millhurst, Monmouth Heights, Oakland Mills, Smithburg, Taylors Mills, Tennent, Tracey, Whittier Oaks and Woodville.

Ecology
According to the A. W. Kuchler U.S. potential natural vegetation types, Manalapan Township, New Jersey would have an Appalachian Oak (104) vegetation type with an Eastern Hardwood Forest (25) vegetation form.

Demographics

2010 census

The Census Bureau's 2006–2010 American Community Survey showed that (in 2010 inflation-adjusted dollars) median household income was $103,970 (with a margin of error of +/− $4,322) and the median family income was $115,292 (+/− $5,344). Males had a median income of $85,086 (+/− $5,699) versus $51,695 (+/− $3,038) for females. The per capita income for the borough was $41,049 (+/− $1,717). About 2.5% of families and 2.8% of the population were below the poverty line, including 3.7% of those under age 18 and 5.4% of those age 65 or over.

2000 census

As the 2000 United States census there were 33,423 people, 10,781 households, and 9,002 families residing in the township. The population density was 1,084.6 people per square mile (418.7/km2). There were 11,066 housing units at an average density of 359.1 per square mile (138.6/km2). The racial makeup of the township was 91.81% White, 1.99% African American, 0.03% Native American, 4.53% Asian, 0.01% Pacific Islander, 0.53% from other races, and 1.10% from two or more races. Hispanic or Latino of any race were 3.54% of the population. Manalapan has large Italian and Jewish communities.

There were 10,781 households, out of which 47.0% had children under the age of 18 living with them, 75.9% were married couples living together, 5.7% had a female householder with no husband present, and 16.5% were non-families. 14.9% of all households were made up of individuals, and 10.4% had someone living alone who was 65 years of age or older. The average household size was 3.09 and the average family size was 3.45.

In the township the population was spread out, with 30.3% under the age of 18, 5.8% from 18 to 24, 27.7% from 25 to 44, 24.5% from 45 to 64, and 11.6% who were 65 years of age or older. The median age was 38 years. For every 100 females, there were 92.2 males. For every 100 females age 18 and over, there were 89.5 males.

The median income for a household in the township was $83,575, and the median income for a family was $94,112. Males had a median income of $72,198 versus $39,921 for females. The per capita income for the township was $32,142. About 3.2% of families and 3.8% of the population were below the poverty line, including 5.1% of those under age 18 and 5.7% of those age 65 or over.

Parks and recreation

Government

Local government
Manalapan Township is governed under the Township form of New Jersey municipal government, one of 141 municipalities (of the 564) statewide that use this form, the second-most commonly used form of government in the state. The Township Committee is comprised of five members, who are elected directly by the voters at-large in partisan elections to serve three-year terms of office on a staggered basis, with either one or two seats coming up for election each year as part of the November general election in a three-year cycle. At an annual reorganization meeting, the Township Committee selects one of its members to serve as Mayor and another as Deputy Mayor for one year.

, members of the Manalapan Township Committee are Mayor Susan Cohen (R, term on committee ends December 31, 2023; term as mayor ends 2022), Deputy Mayor Mary Ann Musich (R, term on committee and as deputy mayor ends 2022), Barry Jacobson (R, 2024), John P. "Jack" McNaboe (R, 2023) and Eric Nelson (R, 2022).

Federal, state, and county representation
Manalapan Township is located in the 3rd Congressional District and is part of New Jersey's 12th state legislative district. 

 

Monmouth County is governed by a Board of County Commissioners comprised of five members who are elected at-large to serve three year terms of office on a staggered basis, with either one or two seats up for election each year as part of the November general election. At an annual reorganization meeting held in the beginning of January, the board selects one of its members to serve as Director and another as Deputy Director. , Monmouth County's Commissioners are
Commissioner Director Thomas A. Arnone (R, Neptune City, term as commissioner and as director ends December 31, 2022), 
Commissioner Deputy Director Susan M. Kiley (R, Hazlet Township, term as commissioner ends December 31, 2024; term as deputy commissioner director ends 2022),
Lillian G. Burry (R, Colts Neck Township, 2023),
Nick DiRocco (R, Wall Township, 2022), and 
Ross F. Licitra (R, Marlboro Township, 2023). 
Constitutional officers elected on a countywide basis are
County clerk Christine Giordano Hanlon (R, 2025; Ocean Township), 
Sheriff Shaun Golden (R, 2022; Howell Township) and 
Surrogate Rosemarie D. Peters (R, 2026; Middletown Township).

Based on data from the 2020 census and the results of congressional redistricting, the township was moved to New Jersey's 3rd congressional district for the period 2022 to 2031.

Politics
As of March 2011, there were a total of 26,256 registered voters in Manalapan Township, of which 6,925 (26.4%) were registered as Democrats, 4,439 (16.9%) were registered as Republicans and 14,875 (56.7%) were registered as Unaffiliated. There were 17 voters registered as Libertarians or Greens.

In the 2012 presidential election, Republican Mitt Romney received 54.2% of the vote (9,949 cast), ahead of Democrat Barack Obama with 44.8% (8,224 votes), and other candidates with 0.9% (169 votes), among the 18,449 ballots cast by the township's 27,734 registered voters (107 ballots were spoiled), for a turnout of 66.5%. In the 2008 presidential election, Republican John McCain received 51.9% of the vote (10,150 cast), ahead of Democrat Barack Obama with 45.9% (8,984 votes) and other candidates with 0.8% (160 votes), among the 19,553 ballots cast by the township's 26,582 registered voters, for a turnout of 73.6%. In the 2004 presidential election, Republican George W. Bush received 52.2% of the vote (9,254 ballots cast), outpolling Democrat John Kerry with 46.2% (8,185 votes) and other candidates with 0.4% (96 votes), among the 17,730 ballots cast by the township's 23,926 registered voters, for a turnout percentage of 74.1.

In the 2013 gubernatorial election, Republican Chris Christie received 73.0% of the vote (7,640 cast), ahead of Democrat Barbara Buono with 25.7% (2,688 votes), and other candidates with 1.3% (132 votes), among the 10,583 ballots cast by the township's 28,056 registered voters (123 ballots were spoiled), for a turnout of 37.7%. In the 2009 gubernatorial election, Republican Chris Christie received 61.9% of the vote (7,581 ballots cast), ahead of  Democrat Jon Corzine with 32.6% (3,995 votes), Independent Chris Daggett with 4.4% (536 votes) and other candidates with 0.6% (69 votes), among the 12,251 ballots cast by the township's 26,168 registered voters, yielding a 46.8% turnout.

Education

Public school students in pre-kindergarten through eighth grade attend the Manalapan-Englishtown Regional School District, which also serves children from Englishtown. Manalapan and Englishtown formally joined as a regional elementary school district in 1963, with an initial enrollment of 1,140 students; The student body is primarily from Manalapan Township, which accounts for about 95% of enrollment, with Englishtown students accounting for the remaining 5%. As of the 2019–20 school year, the district, comprised of eight schools, had an enrollment of 4,910 students and 408.4 classroom teachers (on an FTE basis), for a student–teacher ratio of 12.0:1. Schools in the district (with 2019–20 enrollment from the National Center for Education Statistics) are 
John I. Dawes Early Learning Center with 365 students in Pre-K and K, 
Clark Mills School with 491 students in grades 1–5, 
Lafayette Mills School with 489 students in grades 1–5, 
Milford Brook School with 523 students in grades K–5, 
Taylor Mills School with 600 students in grades K–5, 
Wemrock Brook School with 626 students in grades 1–5, 
Pine Brook School with 563 students in sixth grade and 
Manalapan-Englishtown Middle School with 1,227 students in grades 7 and 8. The district is overseen by a nine-member board of education, which sets policy and oversees the fiscal and educational operation of the district; Seats on the board are allocated based on population, with eight seats assigned to Manalapan Township.

Students from Manalapan Township in public school for ninth through twelfth grades attend either Freehold Township High School or Manalapan High School as part of the Freehold Regional High School District (FRHSD), with the school attended based on the student's address. The Freehold Regional High School District also serves students from Colts Neck Township, Englishtown, Farmingdale, Freehold Borough, Freehold Township, Howell Township and Marlboro Township.  of the 2019–2020 school year, the high school had an enrollment of 1,879 students and 122.8 classroom teachers (on an FTE basis), for a student–teacher ratio of 15.3:1 and As of the 2019–2020 school year, the high school had an enrollment of 2,029 students and 133.2 classroom teachers (on an FTE basis), for a student–teacher ratio of 15.2:1. The FRHSD board of education has nine members, who are elected to three-year terms from each of the constituent districts. Each member is allocated a fraction of a vote that totals to nine points, with Manalapan Township allocated one member, who has 1.4 votes.

Public high school students in Manalapan and all of Monmouth County also have the option of attending one of the Monmouth County Vocational School District's five career academies. Manalapan's academy is the Science and Engineering Program.

Crime
Manalapan's crime rate per 1,000 residents had reached a low of 8.4 in 2003 (in data since 1996). After reaching a peak of 12.1 in 2007, the rate dropped each subsequent year, reaching 10.4 in 2010 before an uptick to 10.8 in 2011. The violent crime rate per 1,000 had reached a low of 0.3 in 2005, before climbing to 0.8 in 2007, then declining or remaining level in each succeeding year, reaching a rate of 0.4 in 2011.

In 2008, seven residents of Manalapan were arrested on money laundering and drug trafficking charges for their involvement in an international drug ring bringing in a net of $1 million per month.

Community

Manalapan landmarks include the headquarters facility of the Monmouth County Library, the Manalapan Recreation Center, and the battlefield for the Battle of Monmouth.  Manalapan Under the Stars, the township's community celebration featuring rides, concerts, fireworks, and other activities, is held annually at the Recreation Center. Performers featured in the series have included Herman's Hermits Starring Peter Noone and Tommy James and the Shondells.

In 2004, Manalapan was rated the second-hottest town on the East Coast by Money magazine.

On May 27, 2001, Manalapan was struck by a tornado rated F2 on the Fujita scale, causing over $1 million in damage.

Infrastructure

Public safety

Emergency services
The Township of Manalapan has multiple emergency service departments.

Police
The Manalapan Township police department is a large force composed of 55 officers. The force has two major divisions; operations and administration. The Operations Division is headed by Deputy Chief Leonard Maltese, and the Administration Division is headed by Deputy Chief Thomas Mantle. On February 8, 2021, Edward Niesz was promoted as Chief of Manalapan Township Police Department, succeeding former Chief Michael Fountain; Fountain had served with the department for 27 years, the final four-plus years as Police Chief.

Fire Prevention

Fire squads
Manalapan Township has three volunteer fire companies:

 Manalapan Township Fire Company #1, founded in 1949, is located on Sweetmans Lane and serves the southern portion of the township
 Manalapan Township Fire Company #2: Gordons Corner Fire Company (founded 1962) is located in the heavily suburbanized community of Yorketown in the northern portion of the township. It has two branches that serves the community, one located on Tennent Road, and another on Pease Road
 Englishtown Fire Department is located in neighboring Englishtown and serves central portions the township.

First aid squads
Englishtown-Manalapan First Aid Squad (EMFAS) is a regional pre-hospital emergency care service for Englishtown and Manalapan residents. The organization was founded in 1941, and is located in Englishtown.

Transportation

Roads and highways

Manalapan hosts U.S. Route 9 in the northeast, and State Route 33 passes through near the southern part of the township. Major county routes, such as 522 and 527 traverse through the municipality, while 524 and 537 goes along the southeast border of the township.

Other major roads that are accessible outside the township are the Garden State Parkway in bordering Old Bridge, Interstate 195 in bordering Millstone Township, and the New Jersey Turnpike (Interstate 95) in East Windsor (Exit 8) and bordering Monroe Township (Exit 8A).

Public transportation

Rail
In the 19th & 20th centuries, Englishtown Borough and Manalapan Township had a major railway in the area, which was the Freehold and Jamesburg Agricultural Railroad. This railway was owned and operated by the Camden & Amboy Railroad Company (C&A), in which surveying for the line began on September 8, 1851, grading began on October 19, 1852, and the first track was laid on April 4, 1853. The first section of line was opened on July 18, 1853. The establishment of the Freehold & Jamesburg Agricultural Railroad allowed this region to become a transportation hub. The Freehold and Jamesburg Railroad was abandoned by the early 1930s. A  portion of the former railroad's right-of-way was later approved to be sold by the New Jersey Board of Public Utility Commissioners (PUC) to Jersey Central Power & Light Company in 1966, with occasional freight service still being utilized through the Freehold Industrial Track.

The Monmouth Ocean Middlesex Line is a proposal by New Jersey Transit to restore passenger railway service to the region. The township would be a potential stop for the 'MOM' Line.

As of now, the nearest train stations to the township are Metropark in Iselin, Metuchen, New Brunswick, and Princeton Junction on the Northeast Corridor Line.

Busing
NJ Transit currently provides bus service on the 139 route to the Port Authority Bus Terminal in Midtown Manhattan, to Newark and Jersey City on the 64 and 67 routes, and local service on the 307 route.

Aviation
Following the closure of the Marlboro Airport, Old Bridge Airport supplies short-distance flights to surrounding areas and is the closest air transportation services.

Healthcare
Manalapan Township is served by CentraState Healthcare System, which is affiliated with Rutgers Robert Wood Johnson Medical School, located in neighboring Freehold Township. The regional hospital is a 287-bed medical facility. CentraState Healthcare system also provides healthcare through its various family practices in communities across western Monmouth and southern Middlesex counties in central New Jersey. The next closest hospitals to the township are the Old Bridge Division of Raritan Bay Medical Center in nearby Old Bridge Township, Penn Medicine Princeton Medical Center in nearby Plainsboro Township, and Saint Peter's University Hospital and Robert Wood Johnson University Hospital in nearby New Brunswick.

Notable people

People who were born in, residents of, or otherwise closely associated with Manalapan Township include:

 Robby Andrews (born 1991), 2016 American Olympic 1500m runner and NCAA mid-distance running champion
 Jim Babjak (born 1957), guitarist for the Smithereens
 Danny Basavich (born 1978), professional pool player
 Jason Bergmann (born 1981), pitcher for the Washington Nationals
 Rachel Breton (born 1990), soccer striker and defender who played for Sky Blue FC and New Jersey Wildcats
 Lou Brutus (born 1962), radio host, musician and photographer
 Alyssa Campanella (born 1990), Miss New Jersey Teen USA 2007, Miss California USA 2011, and Miss USA 2011
 Frank Conover (born 1968), football player for the NFL's Cleveland Browns in 1991 who was drafted out of Syracuse University
 Frank Coppa (born 1941), gangster in the Bonanno crime family
 David DeJesus (born 1979), right fielder for the Tampa Bay Rays
 Louie DeVito, DJ and producer
 Michael DeVito (born 1961), competitive eater and three-time winner of the Nathan's Hot Dog Eating Contest
 Vic Dibitetto (born 1961), comedian and actor
 Dylan Dreyer (born 1981), meteorologist on Weekend Today
 Val Emmich (born 1979), singer, songwriter and actor
 Anthony Firkser (born 1995), tight end for the Atlanta Falcons
 Jay Glazer (born 1969), sportswriter and National Football League insider for Fox Sports
 Ishmael Hyman (born 1995), American football wide receiver for the Tampa Bay Buccaneers of the NFL
 Nick Mara (born 1997), singer, dancer
 Kyle Mullen (died 2022, class of 2015) former captain of the Yale Bulldogs football team who enlisted in the United States Navy after college and died following the "Hell Week" portion of Navy SEAL training
 Jack Perri (born 1975), head men's basketball coach at Southern New Hampshire University
 Johnny Petraglia (born 1947), former professional ten-pin bowler who won 14 PBA titles and the PBA Triple Crown
 Daniel Rosenthal (born 1991), politician who has since 2017 represented the 27th District in the New York State Assembly and was the Assembly's youngest member when he took office
 Dan Smith (born 1989), professional poker player whose poker tournament championships include a World Poker Tour title
 Mike "The Situation" Sorrentino (born 1981), cast member of MTV's Jersey Shore
 Carl R. Woodward (1890–1974), educator and college administrator who served from 1951 to 1958 as the first president of the University of Rhode Island

References

External links

 
1848 establishments in New Jersey
Populated places established in 1848
Township form of New Jersey government
Townships in Monmouth County, New Jersey